Peruvian Democratic Union (in Spanish: Unión Democrática Peruana) was a political party in Peru.  It was founded in 1942 by Julio Marcial Rossi Corsi with the name Frente de la Peruanidad en Defensa de la democracia.
Defunct political parties in Peru
Political parties established in 1942
1942 establishments in Peru